Alexander Lvovich Parvus, born Israel Lazarevich Gelfand (8 September 1867 – 12 December 1924) and sometimes called Helphand in the literature on the Russian Revolution, was a Marxist theoretician, publicist, and controversial activist in the Social Democratic Party of Germany.

Biography

Early life 
Israel Lazarevich Gelfand was born to a Lithuanian Jewish family on 8 September 1867 in the shtetl of Berazino in the Russian Empire, (in present-day Belarus). Although little is known of Israel's early childhood, the Gelfand family belonged to the lower-middle class, with his father working as an artisan of some sort — perhaps as a locksmith or as a blacksmith. When Israel was a small boy, a fire damaged the family's home in Berazino, prompting a move to the city of Odessa, Russian Empire, (present-day Ukraine), the hometown of Israel's paternal grandfather.

Gelfand attended  gymnasium in Odessa and received private tutoring in the humanities. He also read widely on his own, including material by the iconic Ukrainian poet Taras Shevchenko, the journalist Nikolai Mikhailovsky, and the political satirist Mikhail Saltykov-Shchedrin, which led the young Gelfand to begin to question the legitimacy of the Tsarist Empire.

Revolutionary 
In 1886, the 19-year-old Gelfand first travelled from Russia to Basel, Switzerland. It was there that Gelfand was first exposed to the writings of Alexander Herzen as well as the revolutionary literature of the day. He returned to Russia briefly the following year but he became the subject of official scrutiny by the tsarist secret police and was forced to leave the country again for his safety. He would remain abroad for more than a decade.

Returning to Switzerland, in the autumn of 1888 Gelfand enrolled at the University of Basel, where he studied political economy. Gelfand would remain at the university for the next three years, graduating with a doctorate degree in July 1891. Gelfand's professors were largely hostile to his Marxist approach to economics, however, and difficulty in his oral examination resulted in a rider being attached to the degree which rendered it the equivalent of a third class degree.

Gelfand chose not to pursue an academic career but rather sought to begin a political career which would both provide him financial support and serve the cause of socialism. Alienated from the backwardness of agrarian Russia and the limited political horizons there, Gelfand moved to Dresden, in Germany, joined the Social Democratic Party and took over the editorship of the socialist newspaper Sächsische Arbeiterzeitung. He enlisted the German revolutionary Rosa Luxemburg as a contributor.

From 28 January to 6 March 1898, Parvus used his newspaper to run a series of polemical articles attacking the German Marxist Eduard Bernstein, who had queried Marx's prediction that the collapse of capitalism was inevitable, and advocated a non-violent reforms as the route to socialism. Giving his series the title 'Bernstein's Overthrow of Socialism', he attacked Bernstein in personal terms, as someone who had deserted Marxism. He was in a minority within the SDP, most of whose leaders were shocked by his intemperate language, but he was backed by Rosa Luxemburg, and the leading Russian Marxist, Georgi Plekhanov.

On 25 September 1898, Parvus and his assistant editor, Julian Marchlewski were expelled from Saxony, and settled in Munich, handing control of Sächsische Arbeiterzeitung to Rosa Luxemburg. In Munich, he founded the publishing house that introduced the work of Maxim Gorky to Germany. In 1900, Parvus met Vladimir Lenin for the first time, in Munich, each admiring the other's theoretical works. Parvus encouraged Lenin to begin publishing his revolutionary paper Iskra.

Parvus' attempts to become a German citizen proved fruitless. He once commented in a letter to his German friend Wilhelm Liebknecht that "I am seeking a government where one can inexpensively acquire a fatherland."

Russian Revolution of 1905 
After the outbreak of the Russo-Japanese War, Parvus wrote a series of articles for Iskra, beginning in February 1904, in which he forecast the decline of the nation state as capitalist competition made states more interdependent, that there would be a series of wars as states fought, and that there would be a political upheaval in Russia that would 'shake the bourgeois world.' for survival.

Shortly after Bloody Sunday, when troops fired on a peaceful crowd in Saint Petersburg, setting off the 1905 Russian Revolution, the young Leon Trotsky came with his wife to stay at Parvus's home in Munich, and showed him the manuscript of a pamphlet, to which Parvus added a preface, in which Trotsky developed Parvus's ideas, adding the possibility that revolution in Russia could bring a "workers' government" to power, contrary to the standard Marxist view that Russia would need to go through a phase after the overthrow of the monarchy in which was exercised by a government controlled by the Bourgeoisie. This was known as the theory of Permanent Revolution. Trotsky later acknowledged Parvus's influence over him. He wrote:

There were broad discussions on the questions of "permanent revolution" within the social democratic movement in the period leading up to 1917.

In October 1905, Parvus returned to St Petersburg, where he helped Trotsky take control of the daily paper, Russkaya Gazeta, and cofounded with Trotsky and Julius Martov the daily Nachalo (The Start). Arrested in April 1906, he was visited by Rosa Luxemburg in the Peter and Paul Fortress Sentenced to three years' exile in Siberia, Parvus escaped and emigrated to Germany, where he published a book about his experiences called In the Russian Bastille during the Revolution.

Maxim Gorky affair 
Before he left for Russia, Parvus struck a deal with Maxim Gorky to produce his play The Lower Depths. According to the agreement, the majority of the play's proceeds were to go to the Russian Social Democratic Party (and approximately 25% to Gorky himself). Parvus' failure to pay (despite the fact that the play had over 500 showings) caused him to be accused of stealing 130,000 German gold marks. Gorky threatened to sue, but Rosa Luxemburg convinced Gorky to keep the quarrel inside the party's own court. Eventually, Parvus paid back Gorky, but his reputation in party circles was damaged.

Istanbul period 
Soon afterwards Parvus moved to Istanbul in the Ottoman Empire, where he lived for five years. There he set up an arms trading company which profited handsomely during the Balkan War. He became the financial and political advisor of the Young Turks. In 1912 he was made editor of Turk Yurdu, their daily newspaper. He worked closely with the triumvirs known as the Three Pashas—Enver, Talat and Cemal—and Finance Minister Djavid Bey. His firm dealt with the deliveries of foodstuffs for the Ottoman army and he was a business partner of the Krupp concern, of Vickers Limited, and of the famous arms dealer Basil Zaharov. Arms dealings with Vickers Limited at war time gave basis to the theory that Alexander Parvus was also a British intelligence asset.

Russian Revolution 
While in Turkey, Parvus became close with German ambassador Hans Freiherr von Wangenheim who was known to be partial to establishing revolutionary fifth columns among the allies.  Consequently, Parvus offered his plan via Baron von Wangenheim to the German General Staff: the paralyzing of Russia via general strike, financed by the German government (which, at the time, was at war with Russia and its allies). Von Wangenheim sent Parvus to Berlin where the latter arrived on the 6 March 1915 and presented a 20-page plan titled A preparation of massive political strikes in Russia to the German government.

Copenhagen operation 
Some accuse Parvus of having funded Lenin while in Switzerland. Other authors, however, are skeptical. Scharlau and Zeman conclude in their biography of Parvus that there was no cooperation between the two, declaring that "Lenin refused the German offer of aid." Parvus's bank account shows that he only paid out a total of 25,600 francs in the period between his arrival in Switzerland in May 1915 and the February Revolution of 1917. Parvus did little in Switzerland, Alfred Erich Senn concludes. Austrian intelligence thought Parvus gave money to Russian emigres' newspapers in Paris. However, in the beginning of 1915 the sources of funding became clearer to Lenin and the other Paris emigrés, whereupon they rejected further support. Harold Shukman concluded, "funds were plainly not flowing into Lenin's hands" 

Parvus placed his bets on Lenin, as the latter was not only a radical but willing to accept the sponsorship of the Tsar's wartime enemy, Germany. The two met in Bern in May 1915 and agreed to collaboration through their organizations, though Lenin remained very careful never to get associated with Parvus in public. There is no certain proof that they ever met face to face again, although there are indications that such a meeting may well have occurred on 13 April 1917, during Lenin's stop-over in Stockholm.

Parvus assiduously worked at keeping Lenin's confidence, however Lenin kept him at arm's length to disguise the changing roles of both men, Parvus involvement with German intelligence and his own liaisons with his old ally, who was not respected anymore among the socialists after his years in Turkey and after becoming a millionaire entrepreneur. German intelligence set up Parvus' financial network via offshore operations in Copenhagen, setting up relays for German money to get to Russia via fake financial transactions between front organizations. A large part of the transactions of these companies were genuine, but those served to bury the transfer of money to the Bolsheviks, a strategy made feasible by the weak and overburdened fiscal and customs offices in Scandinavia, which were inadequate for the booming black market in these countries during the war.

It is still debated whether the money with which this financial network operated was actually of German origin. The evidence published by Alexander Kerensky's Government in preparation for a trial scheduled for October (November) 1917 was recently reexamined and found to be either inconclusive or outright forgery. (See also Sisson Documents)

Leon Trotsky responded to allegations that Lenin had colluded with German intelligence in his return to St Petersburg in Volume 2 Chapter 4 of his History of the Russian Revolution.

Death 
Parvus died in Berlin on 12 December 1924. His body was cremated and interred in a Berlin cemetery. After his death, Konrad Haenisch wrote in his memoir: "This man possessed the ablest brains of the Second International".

During his lifetime, Alexander Parvus' reputation among his revolutionary peers suffered as a result of the Maxim Gorky affair (see above) and the fact that he was in effect a German government agent. At the same time both his business skills and revolutionary ideas were appreciated and relied upon by Russian and German revolutionaries and Ottoman's Young Turks. After the October Revolution in Russia for obvious political reasons his role was denied and he himself vilified. This continued during Joseph Stalin's era and sometimes had anti-semitic overtones to it. In Germany however he was considered favorably. His name is often used in modern political debates in Russia.

Family 
Parvus left no documents after his death and all of his savings disappeared. He was married at least three times. In 1906, Rosa Luxemburg wrote Karl Kautsky saying: "Wife number three is here in St Petersburg" - just after his second wife had fled an anti-semitic Pogrom in Odessa, and had arrived in Warsaw, destitute. One of his wives, Tatiana Berman, was born in Odessa in 1868 and died there in 1917, aged 49.  Their son, Yevgeny (Gnedin), was born in Dresden in 1898.  

Although the Soviet authorities refused to allow Parvus to return to Russia, both his surviving sons, Yevgeny Gnedin and Leon Helfand, were allowed to settle in the USSR, and became Soviet diplomats. Yevgeny Gnedin was head of the press department at the People's Commissariat for Foreign Affairs, at the time of his arrest on 11 May 1939, which coincided with the dismissal of the foreign minister, Maxim Litvinov. He refused to confess, despite being tortured by the police chief, Lavrentiy Beria and his deputy, Bogdan Kobulov. He survived years in the Gulag, and wrote memoirs "Catastrophe and Rebirth" and in "Exit from the Labyrinth" describing his experience.  He died in 1983.

Media
He was portrayed by English actor Michael Gough in the 1974 BBC mini-series Fall of Eagles, covering the history of the pre-World War I period. In 1988 he was portrayed by English actor Timothy West in the film Lenin...The Train.
He was also portrayed by the Armenian Actor Kevork Malikyan in the 2017 Turkish TV series Payitaht: Abdülhamid, covering the struggles and  intelligence of the Ottoman Sultan of that period to keep the empire together.

See also 
 Yakov Ganetsky

Footnotes

Further reading

External links
 

1867 births
1924 deaths
People from Berazino
People from Igumensky Uyezd
Belarusian Jews
Russian Social Democratic Labour Party members
Mensheviks
Social Democratic Party of Germany politicians
Jewish socialists
Marxist theorists
People of the Russian Revolution
Arms traders
World War I spies for Germany
Bolshevik finance
German expatriates in Turkey
Young Turks